Vadim Dotsenko (Russian: Вадим Доценко; born 3 June 1988) is a Belgian former footballer who is last known to have played as a forward for Coxyde.

Career

Dotsenko started his career with Belgian top flight side Roeselare.

Before the second half of 2010/11, he was sent on loan to Willebroek in the Belgian lower leagues.

In 2011, Dotsenko signed for Belgian lower league club KVK Ieper, before joining Coxyde in the Belgian fourth division due to injury.

References

External links
 
 Vadim Dotsenko at SoccerPunter

Belgian people of Russian descent
Living people
Association football forwards
1988 births
Challenger Pro League players
Belgian Pro League players
Sportspeople from Bishkek
K.S.V. Roeselare players
K.V.V. Coxyde players
Belgian footballers